Noh Hyun-Suk (born October 10, 1966) is a male South Korean former handball player who competed in the 1988 Summer Olympics.

In 1988 he won the silver medal with the South Korean team. He played one match.

External links
profile

1966 births
Living people
South Korean male handball players
Olympic handball players of South Korea
Handball players at the 1988 Summer Olympics
Olympic silver medalists for South Korea
Olympic medalists in handball
Medalists at the 1988 Summer Olympics
20th-century South Korean people